Cristian Javier Vega (born 27 August 1979) is an Argentine former professional footballer who played as a defender.

Career
Vega's career began in 1999 with Primera B Metropolitana side Flandria, a club the defender remained with for four years whilst scoring nine goals in one hundred and six encounters. 2003 saw Vega join Deportivo Morón, which preceded spells with All Boys and Tristán Suárez between then and 2007; he was selected over one hundred times in that period. Vega joined Los Andes ahead of the 2007–08 Primera B Metropolitana campaign, which subsequently led to them winning promotion to Primera B Nacional. He scored goals versus Quilmes and San Martín as Los Andes were then relegated, in what was his sole season in the second tier.

On 30 June 2010, Vega joined Torneo Argentino A's Unión Sunchales. Three goals in thirty-five games followed. Fellow Torneo Argentino A club Santamarina signed Vega in June 2011, prior to Atlanta of Primera B Metropolitana signing Vega for the 2012–13 campaign. After one year with Atlanta, Vega agreed to rejoin Santamarina in 2013. He made the final appearance of his senior career on 6 April 2014 as Santamarina drew 2–2 away to Guaraní Antonio Franco on their way to winning the 2013–14 Torneo Argentino A title. In total, Vega scored twenty-three goals in four hundred and fifty-two career league matches.

Career statistics

Honours
Santamarina
Torneo Argentino A: 2013–14

References

External links

1979 births
Living people
People from Concordia, Entre Ríos
Sportspeople from Entre Ríos Province
Argentine footballers
Association football defenders
Primera B Metropolitana players
Primera Nacional players
Torneo Argentino A players
Flandria footballers
Deportivo Morón footballers
All Boys footballers
CSyD Tristán Suárez footballers
Club Atlético Los Andes footballers
Unión de Sunchales footballers
Club y Biblioteca Ramón Santamarina footballers
Club Atlético Atlanta footballers